Syzygium grande or sea apple is a tall tree that can reach 30 m. The trees can be found along the coastal line of Southeast Asia. Its leaves are large with dark green color. The flowers are white and compact in clusters with strong scent. Fruits are oblong in shape and green.

References

grande